Adam Daghim (born 28 September 2005) is a Danish footballer currently playing as a forward for AGF.

Club career
Daghim became the youngest Aarhus Gymnastikforening player to play in the Danish Superliga when he made his debut in a 0–0 draw with Vejle Boldklub in April 2022. In the same month, he signed his first professional contract with the club.

International career
Daghim is eligible to represent Denmark and Palestine at international level.

Career statistics

Club

Notes

References

External links
 

2005 births
Living people
Danish people of Palestinian descent
Danish men's footballers
Association football forwards
Danish Superliga players
F.C. Copenhagen players
Aarhus Gymnastikforening players